Pender Township is one of eleven townships in Thurston County, Nebraska, United States. The population was 1,242 at the 2020 census.

The village of Pender lies within the southwestern part of township. Nebraska Highway 9 and Nebraska Highway 16 both pass through the township, and Nebraska Highway 94 has its western terminus in the village of Pender. Logan Creek (also known as Logan Creek Dredge) also runs through the township.

See also
 List of Nebraska townships
 County government in Nebraska

References

External links

 City-Data.com

Townships in Thurston County, Nebraska
Townships in Nebraska